Dewdrop is an unincorporated community within Elliott County, Kentucky, United States.

References

Unincorporated communities in Elliott County, Kentucky
Unincorporated communities in Kentucky